Helmut Gollwitzer (29 December 1908 – 17 October 1993) was a German Protestant (Lutheran) theologian and author.

Born in Pappenheim, Bavaria, Gollwitzer studied Protestant theology in Munich, Erlangen, Jena and Bonn (1928–1932); he later completed a doctorate under Karl Barth in Basel (1937), writing on the understanding of the eucharist in Martin Luther and John Calvin.

During the period of the Nazi regime in Germany, Gollwitzer was a well-known member of the Confessing Church movement, which resisted the regime's attempt to control the churches. He took over as the pastor of the congregation at Berlin-Dahlem after the arrest of Martin Niemöller.

During World War II, Gollwitzer served as a medic at the Eastern Front, and was a Prisoner of War in the Soviet Union from 1945 to 1949. He wrote a book about his experience of being a POW which became a bestseller in Germany in 1950 (Unwilling Journey: A Diary from Russia); the then President of West Germany, Theodor Heuss, called it "a great historical document".

Gollwitzer was appointed professor of systematic theology at the University of Bonn (1950–1957), and then as professor of Protestant theology at the Free University of Berlin; he retired in 1975. He had been Karl Barth's first choice as his successor in Basel, but the university authorities turned him down due to what they called 'his unclear attitude to the Soviet Union'. Dr. W. Travis McMaken illustrates Gollwitzer's role in the theology and politics of the twentieth century in his latest book, Our God Loves Justice: An Introduction to Helmut Gollwitzer. He explains Gollwitzer's close relationship with Barth, and the socialist political ideas Gollwitzer held throughout his life.

Known as a close friend of Rudi Dutschke, whose wife studied with Gollwitzer, and a pastor to Ulrike Meinhof, he was prominently involved in the political debates ensuing in the late 1960s and 1970s. Gollwitzer was a pacifist and well-known opponent of nuclear weapons, the US engagement in Vietnam and the arms race, as well as a staunch critic of capitalism.

Gollwitzer died in Berlin on 17 October 1993.

Footnotes

External links
 "Why am I a Christian Socialist?" (Better translation: Why am I, as a Christian, a Socialist?) 
 (with detailed Bibliography).

Literature
 Gollwitzer, H 1953. Unwilling Journey: A Diary from Russia. Philadelphia: Muhlenberg Press.
 Gollwitzer, H 1956. Dying We Live: The Final Messages and Records of the Resistance. New York: Pantheon.
 Gollwitzer, H 1965. The Demands of Freedom: Papers by a Christian in West Germany. New York: Harper & Row.
 Gollwitzer, H 1965. The Existence of God as Confessed by Faith. London: SCM.
 Gollwitzer, H 1970. The Christian Faith and the Marxist Criticism of Religion. New York: Scribner.
 Gollwitzer, H 1970. The Rich Christians and Poor Lazarus. New York: Macmillan.
 Gollwitzer, H 1982. An Introduction to Protestant Theology. Philadelphia: Westminster Press.
 McMaken, W. Travis 2017. Our God Loves Justice: An Introduction to Helmut Gollwitzer. Minneapolis: Fortress Press.

1908 births
1993 deaths
People from Pappenheim
People from the Kingdom of Bavaria
German Lutheran theologians
Lutheran pacifists
Christian Peace Conference members
University of Bonn alumni
Academic staff of the University of Bonn
20th-century German Protestant theologians
German male non-fiction writers
20th-century Lutherans